Berkeley High School is located in Moncks Corner, South Carolina, which is the county seat of Berkeley County.  The school serves 1,753 students from the towns and communities of: Moncks Corner, Cordesville, Lebanon, Longridge, MacBeth, Oakley, Pimlico, Santee Circle, and Whitesville.  Berkeley County’s current population is approximately 221,091 with a racial composition of 64% Caucasian, 24% African American, 6% Hispanic, and 2% Asian.

Berkeley County is one of the fastest growing communities in South Carolina.  Some of its largest employers are the Naval Weapons Station, Berkeley County School District, Santee Cooper, Blackbaud Inc., Nucor, Berkeley County Government, and Alcoa Mt. Holly.  The two latest companies to locate in Berkeley County are Google and Boeing.  The tri-county area welcomes new manufacturing facilities every year.

The county’s continued growth presents a challenge for the Berkeley County School District and Berkeley High School.  For economic growth to be sustained, the school district must provide employers with a highly skilled workforce that meets the challenge of a global economy.  To meet this challenge, parents, faculty, and students have agreed that the mission of Berkeley High School is as follows:

Building upon our rich Lowcountry traditions, we will ignite, in every student, a passion for life-long learning.  Through dynamic instruction, creative partnerships and exceptional support, we will foster opportunities for each student to build a legacy of success.

Notable alumni

Henry E. Brown, Jr. (class of 1953): member of the United States House of Representatives for South Carolina's 1st congressional district, 2001–2011
Omar Brown (class of 2007): football defensive back for the Baltimore Ravens of the National Football League (NFL) since 2012; part of the Super Bowl XLVII championship Ravens team
Mike Dingle (class of 1986): former NFL player
Andre Ellington (class of 2008): football running back; played at Clemson University from 2009 to 2012 and in the NFL for the Arizona Cardinals since 2013
Bruce Ellington (class of 2010): football wide receiver; played football and basketball at the University of South Carolina, 2010–2013; drafted by the San Francisco 49ers in the 4th round / pick 106 of the NFL draft
Steven Furtick (class of 1999): Southern Baptist pastor and founder of Elevation Church in Charlotte, North Carolina; bestselling author
Jabari Levey (class of 2002): football offensive lineman
Demetrius McCray (class of 2009): former NFL player
Israel Mukuamu : NFL player, he transferred after his junior season
Ryan Stewart (class of 1992): football safety; played for the Detroit Lions of the NFL, 1996–2000
Clarence Williams (class of 1992): former NFL player
 Isaac Wright Jr. (born 1962), lawyer
Charlamagne tha God (born 1978): an American radio presenter, television personality, and author; co-host of the nationally syndicated radio show The Breakfast Club.

References

External links
Official website

Public high schools in South Carolina
Schools in Berkeley County, South Carolina
International Baccalaureate schools in South Carolina